The K-700 is a four-wheel drive, heavy duty tractor from the former USSR and current Russian manufacturer of Kirovets.

History 

The tractor was manufactured in 1962, its basic design has been adopted in several subsequent models. The K-700s were also exported to the Comecon member—GDR imported K-700s starting from year 1968. The K-700 is a heavy four-wheel drive tractor-pulling force of 50 kN-class articulated and disconnectable rear wheel drive. The connecting piece of the front and rear frame part is movable about the vertical and the longitudinal axis, the steering takes place by lateral bending by means of hydraulic. It is powered by an eight-cylinder turbo diesel engine in a V-configuration with 215 HP. The K-700 1975 was the further development of K-700 A, including the disposal of the next larger fuel tanks (two tanks of 320 liter capacity) due to larger tires for better traction. The K-700 A provided only a temporary solution. Also in 1975 a successor of K-700 appeared: the K-701. The K-701 has a 12-cylinder naturally aspirated diesel engine with 300 HP. The K-700 tractors were particularly large sized, handling well although the noise and vibration load on the driver was relatively high. In the GDR, its size in off-field operations was sometimes cumbersome. Furthermore, the tractor's sheer size often resulted in soil degradation.

Kirovets tractors were imported to the United States and Canada for a time under the Belarus brand.  They have recently been reintroduced under the MTZ brand.

K-700s and its variants are still used today in former east bloc countries. They are mostly referred as "Ka", because of the model prefix K.

Models and Variants

 K-700 - the base model.
 K-700A - Next model (with a unified K-701, the engine YaMZ-YaMZ-238NDZ turbo).
 K-701 - Next model (unified with R-700A, YaMZ-240).
 K-701M - engine power increased to 300 HP
 K-701 Truck 6X6 V12 All wheel driven truck model for all kinds of roles based on the K701 model.
 K-702 - Industrial modification for use as a base machine for loaders, bulldozers, rollers, scrapers: the system changed portions, only the hydromechanical transmission, suspension rigid.
 K-703 - Industrial modification. The tractor has a reversing control station, allowing the driver to work in a normal position as in the course of the tractor forward, and in the course of the tractor back..
 K-704 - Industrial modification for use as truck crane.
 K-710 - Prototype of tractor with increased engine power to 500 HP

Specifications
Dimensions
Length: 7400 mm
Width: 2880 mm
Height (in cockpit): 3950 mm
Minimum turning radius: 7200 mm
Track width: 2115 mm
Weight of K-700 A: 12.8 tonnes
Weight of K-701: 13.4 tonnes
Speed
 forward 2,9-33,8 km/h
 backwards 5,1-24,3 km/h
Powertrain
Power of YaMZ-240 B , with speed, 1900 rev/min. Maximum torque of 1240 Nm.
Power of YaMZ-238 NB , with speed, 1700 rev/min. Maximum torque of 950 Nm.

References

External links
 Video of a K-700 emerging from a body of water
 Museum of the Russian tractors
 Technical data
 К-700 АТ and К-701 C
 Information about K-7xx series

Tractors of the Soviet Union
Kirov Plant products